Hilfe, meine Familie spinnt (Help, my family is nuts) was a German sitcom that first aired on RTL plus on 4 March 1993. The 26-part television series is an adaptation of the American sitcom Married... with Children.

Background 
The series contained scripts and sets that were almost exact copies of the original American ones, lacking any cultural changes necessary to properly adapt it into German culture. Even the looks and gestures of the actors had to be exactly as those in the original US series. Further contributing to the series' failure was the fact that Married... with Children had already premiered in Germany a year before and was broadcast daily in the afternoon while Hilfe, meine Familie spinnt was broadcast once a week in the evening, on the same station.

Reception 
The series was critically panned due to the poor translation and adaptation of the original scripts. German newspaper taz called it "very boring", while 20 years later in a retrospective article on the show, Der Spiegel said that it "couldn't work". Christian Richter of Quotenmeter.de called it "the probably most colourless comedy series on German television". Moviepilot.de ranked it 1st on a list of "Top 7 German comedy series crimes", commenting: "That 26 episodes of this garbage were made only shows that on German television not everything was better in the past." The series received very poor ratings and was cancelled after the 26 episodes of the first season were broadcast.

See also
List of German television series
List of sitcoms known for negative reception

References

External links
 

1993 German television series debuts
1993 German television series endings
German-language television shows
German television series based on American television series
RTL (German TV channel) original programming
Married... with Children remakes